Cosmosoma bromus is a moth of the family Erebidae. It was described by Pieter Cramer in 1775. It is found in Suriname.

References

bromus
Moths described in 1775
Taxa named by Pieter Cramer